Joel Burns may refer to:

Joel Burns (basketball) (born 1975), an American basketball player,
Joel Burns (politician) (born 1969), an American politician.